Hugo Viart (born 25 December 1979) is a retired freestyle swimmer from France, who represented his native country at the 2000 Summer Olympics. He won the bronze medal at the 2000 European Long Course Championships in the men's 4 × 100 m freestyle relay event.

References
 

French male freestyle swimmers
Swimmers at the 2000 Summer Olympics
Olympic swimmers of France
1979 births
Living people
Place of birth missing (living people)
European Aquatics Championships medalists in swimming
Mediterranean Games silver medalists for France
Mediterranean Games bronze medalists for France
Mediterranean Games medalists in swimming
Swimmers at the 2001 Mediterranean Games